Dalmarnock railway station, serving the Dalmarnock area of Glasgow, Scotland, lies on the Argyle Line,  southeast of Glasgow Central. The northern ends of the side platforms are within a tunnel (refer image). Revamped for the 2014 Commonwealth Games, the station is a 15-minute walk from the Commonwealth Arena and Sir Chris Hoy Velodrome, and Celtic football club's Celtic Park stadium at Parkhead.

History

1879–1964 overview
On the viaduct, at the north side of Dalmarnock Road, was the Caledonian Railway high-level station called Bridgeton. Opened on 1 April 1879, on what was then the London Road branch, it closed when the current station opened on 1 November 1895. 

The siding from the nearby rail yard to the gas works passed under the viaduct, above the current platform area, and across the Swanston Street level crossing. All remnants have since been demolished.

The low-level station closed on 5 October 1964 as a result of the Beeching Axe, but the station and tunnel remained intact.

1979 reopening
In the easterly direction all trains travelled around the Hamilton Circle to  three in the clockwise direction passing through  prior to Motherwell and three passing through  first. The limited stop  to/from  trains did not stop at Dalmarnock.

Station refurbishment
The station underwent a full revamp in time for the 2014 Commonwealth Games, being handy to the athletes' village and several venues. Lifts were installed and a new street-level entrance and ticket office constructed along with landscaping aimed at better connecting the station environs to the nearby River Clyde and Glasgow Green. The station was temporarily closed for renovation on 4 June 2012 and was scheduled to reopen in November 2012, but the closure was extended to spring 2013 because of major problems over groundworks. The station reopened to passengers on 20 May 2013.

Flooding
Record rainfalls have often led to flooding of the station and closure for a period of several hours in 1903, two days in 1907, several hours in 1935 with water reaching platform height, one day for the whole underground in 1938, several weeks in 2002, several hours in 2017 (images), several hours in 2019, and two days in 2020.

Services

Footnotes

References

External links 
 Record and images for Dalmarnock Station at Canmore.org.uk

Railway stations in Glasgow
SPT railway stations
Railway stations served by ScotRail
Railway stations in Great Britain closed in 1895
Railway stations in Great Britain opened in 1895
Railway stations in Great Britain closed in 1964
Railway stations in Great Britain opened in 1979
Reopened railway stations in Great Britain
Beeching closures in Scotland
Former Caledonian Railway stations
Bridgeton–Calton–Dalmarnock